Focus is an abstract strategy board game, designed by Sid Sackson and first published in 1964 by Kosmos. The game has been re-published many times since, sometimes under the titles Domination or Dominio.  Focus won the 1981 Spiel des Jahres and Essen Feather awards.  The game appears in Sackson's A Gamut of Games in the section New Battles on an Old Battlefield.

Gameplay 

Two to four players move stacks of one to five pieces around a checkerboard with the three squares in each corner removed, thus forming a 6×6 board with 1×4 extensions on each side. Stacks may move as many spaces as there are pieces in the stack.  Players may only move a stack if the topmost piece in the stack is one of their pieces.  When a stack lands on another stack, the two stacks merge; if the new stack contains more than five pieces, then pieces are removed from the bottom to bring it down to five.  If a player's own piece is removed, they are kept and may be placed on the board later in lieu of moving a stack.  If an opponent's piece is removed, it is captured.  The last player who is able to move a stack wins.

Reception
Games included the game as Domination in their "Top 100 Games of 1982", noting that while it does include short versions for 3-4 players, "the two-player game has the most depth".

See also 
 Death Stacks

References

External links 

 PDF Rules for Domination, Hasbro's re-publication of the game.
 

Board games introduced in 1964
Abstract strategy games
Spiel des Jahres winners
Sid Sackson games
Kosmos (publisher) games